UnderWater World Guam is one of the longest tunnel-aquariums in the world and the only oceanarium in the United States territory of Guam.

The aquarium opened in 1999 and has more than 2,000 animals representing more than 80 different species. Many of the animals included in the aquarium are native to Guam and the surrounding Marianas Islands.

The aquarium is managed and partly owned by U.S. Aquarium Team (USAT) and is located in 1245 Pale San Vitores Road, Tumon, Guam 96911, Mariana Islands]. The main exhibit is a  tunnel under an  salt-water aquarium.

The aquarium is involved with many conservation efforts on Guam. UnderWater World Guam is a sponsor of the International Coastal Cleanup on Guam every year.  The company also started a (now defunct) group known as the Blue Crew, which consists of employees and other individuals from the community focused on environmental education and restoration efforts.

Animals 
Many of the animals at Underwater World Guam are found in the waters surrounding the  island. 
The main tank features many large animals, including  Grey reef shark, green sea turtle,  Blacktip reef shark,  Zebra shark, and Whiptail stingray. There is also an exhibit featuring four giant Moray eels. The gallery exhibits at Underwater World Guam are home to many unique animals, including Corals and an exhibit featuring fish that can change gender. 

Since it opened, the aquarium has featured live shark feeds throughout the week. Scuba divers feed whitetip reef sharks, nurse sharks and zebra sharks, as well as the whiptail stingray and giant groupers by hand inside the main tank of the aquarium. The divers wear three sets of gloves including one cotton pair, a chainmail glove and one layer of Kevlar. The grey reef shark and blacktip reef shark population is fed from a floating platform above the main tank, as they are too dangerous and unpredictable to be fed by hand.

Conservation efforts 
The aquarium has supported conservation efforts on Guam since the facility opened. In addition to being one of the major sponsors of the International Coastal Cleanup the company also provides free presentations for schools regarding marine life and environmental issues on Guam. UnderWater World Guam also offers special rates for groups to attend field trips through the aquarium with a guided tour.

References

External links

Aquaria in Guam
Companies of Guam
1999 establishments in Guam
Entertainment companies established in 1999
Tumon, Guam